El Capitan Dam is an embankment dam on the San Diego River in southern California. The dam forms the  El Capitan Reservoir and serves mainly to supply water to the city of San Diego as well as providing flood control. It is the second largest storage facility in San Diego's water supply system, after San Vicente Dam.

History
A dam was first proposed for the San Diego River after several years of drought in the early 1900s. The city of San Diego commissioned Engineer Hiram N. Savage to design the structure. Savage proposed the river be impounded at Mission Gorge, in what is now Mission Trails Regional Park. The bedrock canyon had ideal geology for a masonry dam, and the site was only  from the city limits. The reservoir would have flooded a large area of the Mission Valley (now downtown Santee, which was productive agricultural land at the time. Its large surface area would also have been subject to evaporation losses. The City of San Diego favored a dam site at El Capitan, which was located more than  further upstream. The chief benefit of the El Capitan site was that it would create a narrower, deeper reservoir with a more efficient ratio of water storage to evaporation. However, the site had a greater depth to bedrock and would require the construction of a more expensive embankment dam, as well as a longer aqueduct to transport water to the city. Savage refused to consider the El Capitan site and was fired by the city in 1923.

Native Americans of the Capitan Grande Reservation, part of which would be flooded by the proposed reservoir, opposed the project. Some of the Indians insisted the city give them title to new lands before allowing them to move grave sites from the reservoir area. In 1919 Congress passed the El Capitan Act, which transferred the Indians' water rights and lands to the city of San Diego, in exchange for resettlement elsewhere and a payment of $361,420 by the city. The initial act covered only the relocation of people and livestock in the reservoir flood zone, but later was extended to much of the watershed of the San Diego River above El Capitan, in order to protect water quality. Local water districts, including the Cuyamaca Flume Company, also fought against the project, fearing that the dam would reduce the amount of San Diego River water available for their use. Litigation dragged on for years, to the point where "cash-strapped San Diego taxpayers had begun to consider other reservoir sites".

Construction on the dam was financed by $4.5 million in revenue bonds issued in 1924, but even with voter approval, the project did not move forward until the 1930s, when San Diego finally won its case for the necessary water rights. The city approached Savage to design the El Capitan dam, but Savage refused, on the grounds that it was a poor site. In 1931, the decision of whether a dam should be built at El Capitan or Savage's preferred Mission Gorge was held to a public vote. The Mission Gorge site lost by a narrow margin. Savage eventually agreed to design the dam, the first of its kind he had built. Just six months after the dam's completion, Savage died of heart failure. Construction on the dam began in December 1931 using the hydraulic fill method. The embankment was completed in 1934, at a final cost of $5.8 million. It was the second municipal dam to be constructed in the San Diego River basin, after the 1884 Cuyamaca Dam. The El Capitan Pipeline, which connects the reservoir to the city, was completed in the same year. The reservoir did not fill to capacity until 1938, after storms soaked Southern California, causing severe flooding.

Since 2019, four of the city's water supply dams have downgraded from fair to poor condition by California regulators due to deterioration and concerns they could fail due to an earthquake or extraordinary rainfall.

Description

El Capitan Dam is a rock-filled embankment dam with an impervious clay core. The dam is situated in a narrow granite gorge, just below the confluence of Conejos Creek with the San Diego River. Altogether, the dam contains  of material. The spillway is a concrete overflow channel on the north side of the dam with no gates, and overflows once water levels exceed the conservation pool. Normal water releases into the El Capitan Pipeline are made through a control tower with six  valves, allowing water to be drawn from different elevations in order to compensate for temperature and turbidity changes.

It is the biggest of San Diego's local surface water supply reservoirs (San Vicente Reservoir is larger, but is filled mainly with imported Colorado River water). Water levels are unpredictable, as severe floods and multi-year droughts are not uncommon to the region. El Capitan rarely fills because its capacity is so large relative to the average runoff from the watershed above it. The water level is intentionally kept low due to the possibility of failure during an earthquake resulting in less water available during a severe drought. The reservoir is allowed to a maximum 2/3 of capacity throughout the winter and early spring to prevent uncontrolled spills. Since the dam is situated so high in the watershed, it has a limited capacity to control localized flooding along the lower San Diego River.

See also
List of dams and reservoirs in California

References

Dams in California
Buildings and structures in San Diego County, California
San Diego River
United States local public utility dams
Dams completed in 1934
1934 establishments in California